Sheila Lumpe (April 17, 1935 – June 4, 2014) was an American politician who served in the Missouri House of Representatives from 1981 to 1997.

She died of Alzheimer's disease on June 4, 2014, in University City, Missouri at age 79.

References

1935 births
2014 deaths
Democratic Party members of the Missouri House of Representatives
Women state legislators in Missouri